Asim Ahmed is a Maldivian politician, and the United Nations Resident Representative from the Maldives, He was approved for the tenure by the Maldives Parliament, People's Majilis on July 24,2020. 

He was the acting foreign minister and ambassador at large of Maldives after President Ibrahim Mohamed Solih assumed office. He was also the Education Minister of Maldives.

References

External links 
 Official Website of the Ministry of Education, Republic of Maldives

Government ministers of the Maldives
Living people
Year of birth missing (living people)